Strata Entertainment Ltd is a British-based company established in 2010 trading as: Strata Music, Strata Books and Strataville.

Strata Music 
Strata Music (UK) is a boutique artist management company, with associated record label  and distribution company, established in 2010 by Gordon Biggins. It has a small roster of established and developing artists and bespoke services extending into rights management and music publishing.

Associated artists include Die So Fluid, Lamb, Lou Rhodes and LOWB, producer Andy Barlow as well as a growing roster of upcoming artists.

Strataville 
The Strata Music record label rebranded from Strata Music to Strataville in 2016.

Strata Books 
Strata Books is an independent book publisher launched in 2013. It publishes books by musicians.

In November 2014, it published You Can Drum But You Can't Hide, a memoir by former Fall drummer Simon Wolstencroft.
It has published two fiction titles, Don't Breathe the Air and My Name Is Ferdinand by former musician and music journalist Simon Fellowes (Intaferon, Simon F).  It also publishes The Phlunk picture book series - The Phlunk, and The Phlunk's Worldwide Symphony written by Mercury nominated singer-songwriter Lou Rhodes.

References

External links 
Strata Music website
Strata Books website

British record labels
Book publishing companies of the United Kingdom